Delloreen Ennis-London (born 5 March 1975) is a Jamaican hurdling athlete who won the silver medal in the 100 metre hurdles at the 2005 World Championships.

Career
She broke onto the world scene in 1999 when she improved her best by more than half a second. Achieving the result of 12.52 in 2000, she finished fourth at the 2000 Olympics. In Athens 2004, however, she only reached the semi final. She did not beat her own personal best until April 2004 in Denton, Texas, when she lowered it by 1/100 second.

She won the 100 m hurdles at the 2009 national championships, giving her the opportunity to compete at the 2009 World Championships in Athletics in Berlin that year where she won another bronze medal.

Delloreen is coached by Remi Korchemny.

Personal bests

100 metres : 11.77 (2005)
100 metres hurdles : 12.50 (2007)

Achievements

References

External links

1975 births
Living people
Jamaican female hurdlers
Athletes (track and field) at the 2000 Summer Olympics
Athletes (track and field) at the 2004 Summer Olympics
Athletes (track and field) at the 2008 Summer Olympics
Athletes (track and field) at the 2006 Commonwealth Games
Athletes (track and field) at the 2007 Pan American Games
Commonwealth Games bronze medallists for Jamaica
Olympic athletes of Jamaica
World Athletics Championships medalists
Pan American Games gold medalists for Jamaica
Commonwealth Games medallists in athletics
Pan American Games medalists in athletics (track and field)
Medalists at the 2007 Pan American Games
Medallists at the 2006 Commonwealth Games